Ironville Historic District is a national historic district located at Ironville in Essex County, New York. The district contains 12 contributing buildings.  It encompasses the area associated with a once thriving iron works.  Almost nothing remains of the iron works itself.  The remaining buildings consists of modest wooden dwellings including the Penfield Homestead (1828; now a museum), boarding house (1827), Congregational Church (1842), commercial building / grange hall (1870s), and cemetery.  Ironville is known as the "Birthplace of the Electrical Age", being the site of the first industrial application of electricity in the United States.

It was listed on the National Register of Historic Places in 1974.

References

External links
Penfield Homestead Museum in Ironville, NY

Houses on the National Register of Historic Places in New York (state)
Historic districts on the National Register of Historic Places in New York (state)
Historic house museums in New York (state)
Museums in Essex County, New York
National Register of Historic Places in Essex County, New York
Mining communities in New York (state)